Las Rosas is a city in the southwest of the , located  from the provincial capital.

Las Rosas was founded in 1889 by Guillermo Kemmis & Dickinson bros, and was officially recognized on January 1, 1882, becoming a city on August 20, 1967.

Summers there are warm, humid, wet, and mostly clear and the winters are short, cold, dry, and partly cloudy. Over the course of the year, the temperature typically varies from 41 °F to 87 °F and is rarely below 30 °F or above 95 °F.

Notable people 

 Leonardo Ponzio (b. 1982), former football player. Captained River Plate through multiple seasons, capped for Argentina's national team.
 Alfredo Pián (1912 - 1990), race car driver.
 Ramiro Sordo

Sister cities 

  Matelica, Italy

References

 
 
 Municipality of Las Rosas - Official website.

Populated places in Santa Fe Province